Nemedromia is a genus of true fly in the family Atelestidae. Nemedromia is extinct, with all three of its known species having existed in the Late Cretaceous epoch.

References

Empidoidea
Prehistoric Diptera genera